Jan Linssen (19 January 1913 – 2 November 1995) was a Dutch footballer who was active as a forward. Linssen played his whole career at Feijenoord and is known as the player who has never made a single foul. The only referee that fouled him during a match was Dirk Nijs who did this as a joke and to become the only referee that ever fouled Linssen. Linssen played once for the Netherlands national football team, in 1938 against the Dutch Indies and also scored a goal, however the match was not officially recognized as such.

Honours
 1935-36 : Eredivisie winner with Feijenoord
 1937-38 : Eredivisie winner with Feijenoord
 1939-40 : Eredivisie winner with Feijenoord

References

 Profile from fr-fanatic.com

1913 births
1995 deaths
Dutch footballers
Feyenoord players
Association football forwards
Footballers from Rotterdam